Downtown Lafayette Historic District is a national historic district located at Lafayette, Tippecanoe County, Indiana.  Lafayette began in 1825 as a transportation center for the west central area of Indiana. Its development and growth reflects the changes in transportation over the intervening years. From its location along the Wabash River, it grew first with river travel then for a short while from the Wabash and Erie Canal. When the railroads arrived in the 1850s, the town began to grow, initially along the rail lines. The Downtown Lafayette Historic District reflects these early changes.

History
Lafayette was settled here, because of the nearness of the Wabash River. William Digby platted the town in 1825.  The boundaries were the river on the west, Sixth Street on the east, with North Street and South Street creating the north and south edges. Development followed along with the advances in transportation.

The first period of expansion began with the construction of a log courthouse in 1829. The second period of expansion began in 1843 with the arrival of the Wabash and Erie Canal, connecting the county with Toledo and markets on the east coast. The courthouse was replaced with a brick building and Fifth Street was widened to create an open market.

Within a decade, the railroads arrive din town and the third period of expansion began. The Lafayette & Indianapolis Railroad was the first railroad to arrive in Lafayette in 1852. In 1853, the New Albany and Salem Railroad, later called the Monon Railroad that arrived, following Fifth Street. The following year, 1854, the Wabash Line cut across the southeast corner of the city, crossing Main Street at Eleventh.

The railroads spurred the growth of the town  by expanding its markets. Commercial structures such as the Hatcher Building, 1865; the Milwaukee Block, 1866; the Perrin Building, 1877; and many other buildings along Main Street reflect this period of growth.

Significant structures
1860, River City Market, 102-112 North Third Street
1865, Hatcher Building, 10 North Third Street
1866, Milwaukee Block, 502-518 Main Street
1870/1914, Oppenheimer Building, 400 Main Street
1877, Perrin Building, 332 Main Street
1881-1884, Tippecanoe County Courthouse, Courthouse Square
1890, Hirsh Brothers Building, 427 Main Street
1892/1913, Murdock Building, 226 North Sixth Street
1907 Heiremans Building, 219 Main Street
1910,  O'Farrell Building, 408-414 Main Street
1910, Sharp Block, 516 Main Street
1912, Robertson Building, 336-340 Main Street
1915, Fowler Hotel, 407 Ferry Street
1917/1918, First Merchants National Bank, 216 Main Street
1918, Lafayette Life Building, 200-206 Main Street
1926, Lafayette National Bank, 337 Columbia Street
1931, U.S. Post Office Building, 301 Ferry Street
Adjacent to, but not within the district
1902, Big Four Depot,

See also
Centennial Neighborhood District
Ellsworth Historic District
Highland Park Neighborhood Historic District
Jefferson Historic District
Ninth Street Hill Historic District
Park Mary Historic District
Perrin Historic District
St. Mary Historic District
Upper Main Street Historic District

References

Sources
Interim Report Tippecanoe County Interim Report, Indiana Historic Sites and Structures Inventory; Historic Landmarks Foundation of Indiana; May 1990

Italianate architecture in Indiana
Second Empire architecture in Indiana
Buildings and structures completed in 1825
Neighborhoods in Lafayette, Indiana
Historic districts on the National Register of Historic Places in Indiana
Historic districts in Lafayette, Indiana
National Register of Historic Places in Tippecanoe County, Indiana